This article describes about the squads for the 2014 CONCACAF Women's Championship.

Group A

Guatemala
The squad was announced on 30 September 2014.

Head coach: Benjamín Monterroso

Haiti
The squad was announced on 8 October 2014.

Head coach: Shek Borkowski

Trinidad and Tobago
The squad was announced on 6 October 2014.

United States
The squad was announced on 6 October 2014.

Head coach: Jill Ellis

Group B

Costa Rica
A 22-player squad was announced on 29 September 2014. The final roster was revealed on 3 October 2014.

Head coach: Carlos Avedissian

Jamaica
The squad was announced on 5 October 2014.

Head coach: Merron Gordon

Martinique
The squad was announced on 8 October 2014.

Head coach: Charlaine Marie Jeanne

Mexico
The squad was announced on 13 October 2014.

Head coach: Leonardo Cuéllar

References

squads
2014